"Justice for All" is a charity record by former United States President Donald Trump and the J6 Prison Choir, a choir of about 20 men imprisoned for their involvement in the January 6 United States Capitol attack. The profits from the song are dedicated to the legal aid of people incarcerated for the attack. The song was produced by an unidentified recording artist.

Background 

On January 6, 2021, then-President of the United States Donald Trump was suspected to have incited an attack against the United States Capitol in an attempt to interfere with and overturn the election of Joe Biden. The attack was linked to nine deaths, including law enforcement suicides, and around 1,000 people have been charged with crimes in connection to the attack. Since the attack, Trump has admitted to financially supporting those charged with crimes and has promised to consider issuing full pardons to rioters if he is elected president in 2024.

Content 
The song consists of Trump reciting the Pledge of Allegiance of the United States interspersed with the J6 Prison Choir singing "The Star-Spangled Banner" with an ambient backing track. The song finishes with the choir chanting "U-S-A!" three times. The Pledge of Allegiance portion was recorded at Trump's home at Mar-a-Lago, while the choir's singing was recorded through a prison phone.

Music video 
An official music video for the song was released on March, 11, 2023 on Rumble. In the music video footage of the interior and exterior of the prison where members of the J6 Prison Chior are imprisoned are shown. As well footage of Trump during multiple events during his presidency, stock footage of Washington D.C. monuments, and footage of the January 6 United States Capitol attack. At the end of the song the words "Supporting certain prisoners denied their constitutional rights," appear on screen.

Reception 
Barb McQuade, a University of Michigan law professor and former attorney, called the song "a disinformation tactic right out of the authoritarian playbook". Some online users reacted negatively as well, calling Trump "narcissistic" for the song. A YouTube upload of the single has also been viewed over 504,000 times as of March 12, 2023.

See also 
 Justice for J6 rally

References

External links

Charity singles
Works by Donald Trump
The Star-Spangled Banner
Prison music
2023 singles
2023 songs
Propaganda songs
Aftermath of the January 6 United States Capitol attack
Choral compositions
Pledge of Allegiance